African Sports Club is a football club based in the city of Tanga, Tanzania. They competed in the 2015/2016 Tanzanian Premier League, the highest tier of league football in Tanzania.

Home games are played at the Mkwakwani Stadium.

References

Football clubs in Tanzania
Tanga Region